Gören Duyan is a website that allows users to post ads for stolen and lost items, this website founded in 2017.

History 
In 2017, this website was established with the aim of collecting the ads of lost and stolen items under a one platform as a result of the increase in the stolen motorcycle ads and the fact that the ads losing their topicality in social media in a short time. Its mobile application was published in 2018.  While ensuring the finding of pets lost during the quarantine, it gathered the pets lost in the Izmir earthquake under a single platform to be found in a shorter time.

References 

Internet properties established in 2017
Social responsibility organizations
Organizations based in Turkey
Organizations established in 2017
2017 establishments in Turkey